Maryna Zanevska was the defending champion, but chose not to participate.

Polona Hercog won the title, defeating Diāna Marcinkēviča in the final, 6–3, 6–3.

Seeds

Draw

Finals

Top half

Bottom half

External Links
Main Draw

L'Open Emeraude Solaire de Saint-Malo - Singles
L'Open Emeraude Solaire de Saint-Malo
L'Open 35 de Saint-Malo